Alexander Francis St Vincent Baring, 6th Baron Ashburton  (7 April 1898 – 12 June 1991) was a British businessman and politician.

Early life
Baring was born on 7 April 1898. He was the only son of Francis Baring, 5th Baron Ashburton, and the former Claire Hortense.  Through his father, he was a member of the German Baring family and a descendant of American statesman William Bingham.  He had four sisters, only one of whom married, Aurea Vera Baring, the wife of Maj. Charles Balfour (a grandson of Mark McDonnell, 5th Earl of Antrim).

His maternal grandfather was French statesman Hugues-Bernard Maret, duc de Bassano, and his paternal grandparents were Alexander Baring, 4th Baron Ashburton, a Member of Parliament for Thetford, and Leonora Digby (a daughter of Edward Digby, 9th Baron Digby).

He was educated at Eton and the Royal Military College, Sandhurst.

Career
From 1917 to 1923, during the First World War, he saw active service as a Lieutenant with the Royal Scots Greys.  After the war, he served as a Managing Director of the family bank, Baring Brothers, from 1928 to 1962.

In the Second World War, he served in the Auxiliary Air Force as Flight lieutenant in 1939 and as Group captain from 1939 to 1944.  After the War, he returned to his career as a director of the bank in the City of London, before serving as chairman from 1962 to 1968.  He also served as a director of Alliance Assurance (from 1932 to 1968), a member of the London Committee of the Hong Kong and Shanghai Banking Corporation (from 1935 to 1939), a director of Pressed Steel (from 1944 to 1966).

Ashburton served as Deputy Lieutenant of Hampshire from 1951 and 1973 (where he served as a member of Hampshire County Council) and Vice Lieutenant of Hampshire from 1951 to 1960.  From 1960 to 1973, he was Lord Lieutenant and Custos Rotulorum of Hampshire and the Isle of Wight.  From 1961 to 1967, he was chairman of the Hampshire Police Authority and High Steward of Winchester in 1967.

He served as treasurer of the King Edward VII Hospital Fund for London from 1955 to 1964 and a trustee of the King George V Jubilee Trust from 1949 to 1968.  From 1961 to 1973, he was Receiver-General of the Duchy of Cornwall.

Personal life

On 17 November 1924, he was married to Doris Mary Thérèse Harcourt (1900–1981), the eldest daughter of Lewis Harcourt, 1st Viscount Harcourt, and the former Mary Ethel Burns (a niece of J. Pierpont Morgan and granddaughter of Junius Spencer Morgan). Through her, the family acquired the famous 'Harcourt emeralds'. Together, they were the parents of two sons:

 John Francis Harcourt Baring, 7th Baron Ashburton (1928–2020), who married Susan Mary Renwick, a daughter of Robert Renwick, 1st Baron Renwick. They divorced in 1984 and he remarried to Sarah Cornelia Spencer-Churchill, a daughter of John Spencer-Churchill, a grandniece of Prime Minister Winston Churchill.
 Robin Alexander Baring (born 1931), who married Anne Caroline Thalia Gage (born 1931), eldest daughter of the High Sheriff of Shropshire, Major Edward F. P. Gage of Chateau de Combecave, in 1960.

Ashburton and his family lived in Hampshire, where he was active in public life, and later as Lord Lieutenant of the county.

Ashburton died in 1991 leaving two sons. The barony passed to his elder son, John. Since his death, his Garter banner has been on display at Winchester Cathedral.

Awards and decorations
 Knight of Justice of the Venerable Order of Saint John (1960)
 Lord Lieutenant of Hampshire (1960 to 1973)
 Knight Commander of the Royal Victorian Order (1961 Birthday Honours)
 Knight Companion of the Order of the Garter (1969)

Sources

External links
 Hansard.millbanksystems.com
 Alexander Francis St Vincent Baring, 6th Baron Ashburton at the National Portrait Gallery, London

1898 births
1991 deaths
People educated at Eton College
Graduates of the Royal Military College, Sandhurst
Royal Scots Greys officers
British Army personnel of World War I
Knights of the Garter
Knights of the Order of St John
Knights Commander of the Royal Victorian Order
Lord-Lieutenants of Hampshire
Deputy Lieutenants of Hampshire
Royal Air Force personnel of World War II
Alexander
British people of American descent
British people of French descent
British people of German descent
Alexander 6
Eldest sons of British hereditary barons